A graduate certificate is an educational credential representing completion of specialized training at the college or university level. A graduate certificate can be awarded by universities upon completion of certain coursework indicating mastering of a specific subject area. Graduate certificates represent training at different levels in different countries and can be at bachelor's degree or master's degree level.

UK
A graduate certificate (GradCert, GCert, GradC) is a higher education qualification at the same level as a bachelor's degree but more limited in scope, taking less time to complete - normally between one third and two thirds of an academic year (or full-time equivalent). A longer period of work (but still less than required for a degree) would lead to a graduate diploma.

The graduate certificate is positioned at Level 6 (bachelor's degree level) of The framework for higher education qualifications in England, Wales and Northern Ireland, and at Level 9 or 10 (bachelor's degree at ordinary or honours level) of The framework for qualifications of higher education institutions in Scotland. In reference to the European Qualifications Framework, it is a 'first-cycle' qualification at the same level of knowledge and challenge as a first or bachelor's degree but without the same depth and breadth of study. Successful students will typically demonstrate some, but not all, of the kinds of skills, knowledge and capabilities that would be expected for a Bachelor's candidate. Hence this certificate is not considered to be an 'end-of-cycle' qualification (it demonstrates only some of the 'first-cycle' learning outcomes).

Graduate certificates are available in a limited range of subjects that are typically work-related, for example psychology, management, counselling or law.

Graduate certificates are normally taken by those who have already graduated with a bachelor's degree in another discipline (hence the name). This qualification should not be confused with postgraduate certificates or postgraduate diplomas, which are master's degree-level qualification, or with certificates of Higher Education, which are lower-level qualifications normally taken by those without previous HE qualification.

Ireland
A Graduate Certificate (GradCert) is a master's-level qualification indicating the successful completion of a postgraduate programme of education. The minimum entrance requirement is an undergraduate degree. On the National Framework for Qualifications the qualification is at Level 9 or Level 7 on the European Qualifications Framework.

Singapore
In support of the SkillsFuture movement, the  has launched a graduate certificate programme (GradCert). This is a higher education qualification at an equivalent level to a bachelor's degree but more limited in scope, taking less time to complete.

The graduate certificates is designed with working professionals in mind, helping these learners acquire knowledge and skills essential for their workplace.

SMU Academy the professional training arm of Singapore Management University has launched "Bite Sized Credit Bearing" modules that can be combined towards earning a graduate certificate and subsequently a master's degree.

The National University of Singapore, Institute of Systems Science appointed for National Continuing Education & Training (CET) Institute (NCI) for the National Infocomm Competency Framework (NICF) by SkillsFuture Singapore (SSG) and the Infocomm Media Development Authority of Singapore (IMDA) also launches its Stackable Certificate Programmes that provide alternative pathway for continuing education. The series consist of certificates that can be stacked towards earning a graduate certificate and subsequently the graduate diploma or a master's degree.

Canada
Admission requirements vary tremendously among Canadian universities, but in general both graduate students, as well as undergraduate students having completed a Bachelor's degree, can apply to such a program. In some cases, the graduate certificate can represent part of the coursework required for  obtaining a Master's degree.

United States

In the United States, a graduate certificate can be awarded by universities upon completion of certain coursework indicating mastery of a specific subject area.  Graduate certificates represent training at the Master's degree or doctoral level, generally consisting of 12 to 18 semester units of coursework. An accredited bachelor's degree in a related field is a standard prerequisite for entry into a graduate certificate program. In some cases, the graduate certificate can represent part of the coursework required for obtaining a Master's degree or Doctorate.

In teaching, holding a graduate certificate may satisfy program specific education requirements not met with some interdisciplinary degrees.

Australia
In Australia, a Graduate Certificate is a Level 8 qualification alongside the Bachelor (Honours) degree. Entry to a Graduate Certificate typically requires completion of a bachelor's degree or higher. In some cases, admission may be on the basis of significant work experience. Graduate Certificates typically take six months of full-time study to complete.

These courses are usually delivered by universities and private providers.

See also
Academic certificate
Australian Qualifications Framework
Certificate of Advanced Study, a post-masters certification credential.
Graduate diploma

References

Higher education in England
Academic degrees of the United Kingdom
Academic degrees of the United States
Qualifications